Grootes Peak is a peak rising to  in the southern extremity of the Colwell Massif in Victoria Land, Antarctica. It was named by the Advisory Committee on Antarctic Names after Pieter Meiert Grootes of the Quaternary Isotope Laboratory, University of Washington, 1977–94; very active in the United States Antarctic Program ice-coring activity including investigations and papers on Taylor Dome. After 1994 he was director of the Leibniz Laboratory for Age Determination and Isotope Research at the Christian Albrechts University in Kiel, Germany until his retirement in 2009.

References

Mountains of Victoria Land
Scott Coast